Siletzia is a massive formation of early to middle Eocene epoch marine basalts and interbedded sediments in the forearc of the Cascadia subduction zone, on the west coast of North America. It forms the basement rock under western Oregon and Washington and the southern tip of Vancouver Island. It is now fragmented into the Siletz and Crescent terranes.

Siletzia corresponds geographically to the Coast Range Volcanic Province (or Coast Range basalts), but is distinguished from slightly younger basalts that erupted after Siletzia accreted to the continent and differ in chemical composition. The Siletzia basalts are tholeiitic, a characteristic of mantle-derived magma erupted from a spreading ridge between plates of oceanic crust. The younger basalts are alkalic or calc-alkaline, characteristic of magmas derived from a subduction zone. This change of composition reflects a change from marine to continental volcanism that becomes evident around 48 to 42 Ma (millions of years ago), and is attributed to the accretion of Siletzia against the North American continent.

Various theories have been proposed to account for the volume and diversity of Siletzian magmatism, as well as the approximately 75° of rotation, but the evidence is insufficient to determine Siletzia's origin; the question remains open.

The accretion of Siletzia against the North American continent approximately 50 million years ago (contemporaneous with the initiation of the bend in the Hawaiian-Emperor seamount chain) was a major tectonic event associated with a reorganization of the earth's tectonic plates. This is believed to have a caused a shift in the subduction zone, termination of the Laramide orogeny that was uplifting the Rocky Mountains, and major changes in tectonic and volcanic activity across much of western North America.

Exposures and discovery 
The rock of Siletzia has been exposed in various places by tectonic uplift (as around the periphery of the Olympic Mountains), anticlinal folding (such as the Black Hills and Willapa Hills in southwestern Washington), and overthrusting onto other formations (along various faults in central and southern Oregon). These exposures have been variously named the Metchosin Formation of Vancouver Island, the Crescent Formation, Black Hills Formation (Washington), and Willapa Hills volcanics of Washington, and the Siletz River Volcanics and Roseburg Formation of Oregon. (See map. The Grays River Volcanics of Washington and Tillamook Volcanics of Oregon are now considered post-Siletz.) Elsewhere Siletzia is covered by younger volcanic and sedimentary deposits.

The discovery of Siletzia began in 1906 with Arnold's description and naming of a small exposure on the north side of the Olympic Peninsula near Port Crescent. Though this exposure is small, he recognized as very likely that much more of it was buried under younger deposits. With recognition that similar rock exposed at other outcrops is part of the same formation, the name Crescent Formation is now generally applied to all early and middle Eocene basalts on the Olympic Peninsula and Puget lowlands.

The Metchosin Igneous Complex at the southern tip of Vancouver Island was described in a series of reports (1910, 1912, 1913, 1917) by Clapp, who recognized it as correlative with the Crescent formation on the other side of the Strait of Juan de Fuca. Weaver recognized that these "Metchosin volcanics" included various Eocene basalts in western Washington and the Oregon Coast Range as far south as the Klamath Mountains.
The Siletz River Volcanics was described in 1948 by Snavely and Baldwin after exposures near the Siletz River, Oregon, and the Roseburg and related formations in southern Oregon described in various reports from the 1960s on.

Etymology
"Siletzia" was coined in 1979 by Irving, (based in turn on the Siletz River and the Siletz Reservation), to describe the full extent of these Eocene basalts and interbedded sedimentary formations.

Extent 
The map shows the exposures (black) and inferred near-surface extent (pink) of Siletzia, the latter being what can be detected in the upper crust by aeromagnetic, gravitational, or seismological studies.

There are only two exposed contacts of Siletzia with the older (pre-Cenozoic) North American basement. One is near Roseburg, Oregon, where it is thrust against formations of the Klamath Mountains (discussed below), the other is along the Leech River Fault on the southern end of Vancouver Island, where it has pushed the pre-Cenozoic Pacific Rim formation beneath the Wrangellia Terrane). Everywhere else the contact between Siletzia and the rest of the continent is concealed under younger deposits, especially the Cascade Range volcanics. The contact around the Olympic Mountains is actually the bottom contact with the underlying oceanic sediments, tilted up by the uplift of the Olympics and exposed by erosion of about 10 to 12 km of overlying deposits.

The location of the near-surface contact between the Crescent Formation and the pre-Cenozoic metamorphic basement of the continent — what has been the termed the Coast Range Boundary Fault (CRBF) — is largely uncertain. The Leech River Fault extends southeast past Victoria, B.C. to cross the Strait of Juan de Fuca, possibly connecting with the southeast striking Southern Whidbey Island Fault (SWIF). This extends to the Rattlesnake Mountain Fault Zone (RMFZ), some 25 kilometers east of Seattle, which is believed to be the western edge of the pre-Cenozoic basement. However, gravity data indicates that at this latitude the Crescent Formation (at least near the surface) extends no further east than Seattle.

Further south, near Mount St. Helens, is a similar situation, where the St. Helens Fault Zone (SHZ) is believed to be the eastern edge of the Crescent Formation, but the pre-Cenozoic continental basement is near Mount Rainier. Separating these is the marine sedimentary formation known as the Southern Washington Cascades Conductor (SWCC); it is possible that it was deposited over a fragment of Siletzia. Or not: the oldest parts of the SWCC likely predate Siletzia, and the nature and location of the contact between these two formations is unknown.

In central Oregon, Siletzia forms a platform on which the older, now defunct volcanoes of the Western Cascades rest. The younger High Cascades to the east are believed to rest on sediments that accumulated in the basin between Siletzia and the continent.

In southern Oregon, Siletzia has been thrust against the Mesozoic Klamath Mountains of southern Oregon along the Klamath—Blue Mountain Lineament (KBML). Near Roseburg this contact is exposed at the Wild Safari Fault where the Late Jurassic Dothan Formation has been thrust over the Roseburg Formation.

Off the coast of southern Oregon, the western edge of Siletzia is the Eocene Fulmar fault. This is a strike-slip fault, where part of Siletzia has been split off; the missing piece may be the Yakutat terrane now at the head of the Gulf of Alaska. Further north, the terrane boundary is believed to come ashore near the Columbia River.

The way the Crescent Formation wraps around the Olympic Mountains ("Oly" on the map) may reflect oroclinal bending as a result of being crushed against Vancouver Island. It has also been attributed to loss of the deposits originally overlying the Olympics prior to their uplift, resembling a dome where top and western end has been removed.

Siletzia's actual thickness, and the estimates of that thickness, vary. Under Oregon, the Siletz terrane appears to extend 25 to possibly 35 km into the trough between the subducting Juan de Fuca plate and the edge of the continent, where it is slipping over sediments accumulated in the bottom of the trough. The Crescent terrane (under Washington) is believed to be thinner, from as little as 12 and 22 km under the western and eastern ends of the Strait of Juan de Fuca, but possibly as much as 20 and 35 km thick.

Composition 
The various formations of Siletzia are characterized as marine tholeiitic pillow basalts and volcanic breccia, often interbedded with sedimentary layers of continental origin, lying on oceanic crust. These are usually capped by a layer of alkalic volcanics deposited subaerially. All this suggests these formations were initially deposited in an oceanic environment, possibly as seamounts or an island arc.

On the Olympic Peninsula the Blue Mountain unit at the base of the Crescent Formation includes sediments (including large boulders of quartz diorite) of continental origin, suggesting that the continent was close by; other sediments were eroded from the pre-Cenozoic rock of Vancouver Island and the northern Cascade Range. At the southern end are sediments derived from the Klamath Mountains, while sand of the overlying Tyee Formation has an isotopic composition corresponding to rock of the Idaho Batholith.

Age 
Eruption of the Siletzia basalts has been placed roughly in the late Paleocene through the mid Eocene; more specific dates have been difficult to obtain and somewhat variable. Early K-Ar (potassium-argon) and 40Ar-39Ar (argon-argon) radiometric dating by Duncan gave dates of 57 and 62 Ma (million years ago) to the northern and southern ends, and a date of 49 Ma for the Grays River volcanics near the center of Siletzia. This is suggestive of a spreading ridge (as previously noted by ), and has been a strong constraint on models of how Siletzia formed. Other researchers have since found younger dates (50-48 Ma) for the Crescent basalts, removing much of the age symmetry.

Dating from 2010 based on 40Ar-39Ar, U-Pb (uranium-lead), and coccoliths shows a narrower range of ages from 56 Ma in the south to 50 or 49 Ma in the north. Subsequent high-precision U-Pb dates from northern Siletzia show a narrowly constrained age of 51 Ma for the Metchosin complex on Vancouver Island. Of particular interest is the somewhat broader range of approximately 53 to 48 Ma for Crescent Formation basalts on the east side of the Olympic Peninsula that overlie the Blue Mountain unit, reliably dated at 48 Ma or younger. This structural relationship was previously understood as showing that Siletzia – or at least its northern end – was built on the continental margin. It is now argued that the unconformity of ages can be explained by the Blue Mountain unit being thrust under Siletzia some time after 44.5 Ma, and shows that Siletiza was not necessarily emplaced along the continental margin.

Size 
Siletzia is massive: over 400 miles (600 kilometers) long, almost half that much across (and likely further at depth). The original deposits were from 16 to 35 kilometers thick. Weaver, reckoning a minimal thickness of only 3,000 feet, still estimated "nearly 10,000 cubic miles of rock"; he put the total volume to be as great, if not greater, than the better known Columbia River Basalts. Snavely et al., recognizing at least 10,000 feet of thickness, and as much as 20,000 feet under eruptive centers, estimated the volume to be in excess of 50,000 cubic miles (over 200,000 km3).  estimated around 250,000 km3 (about 60,000 cubic miles), which exceeds the volume of most continental rift zones, and some flood basalt provinces. A recent estimate put the volume at 2 million cubic km.

Paleorotation 

When lava solidifies and cools it retains an imprint of the earth's magnetic field, thus recording how it was oriented. Measurements of such paleomagnetic fields in the Oregon Coast Range show rotations of 46 to 75°, all of it following the presumed accretion to the continent (alternately, formation) of the Siletz terrane at about 50 Ma. These rotations are all clockwise, and show a strong correlation with the age of the rock: about one and a half degrees of rotation per million years. These paleomagnetic rotations and other evidence show that Siletzia — or the part of it constituting the Siletz terrane ("SZ" on map, above), from the Klamath Mountains to the Columbia River — has rotated clockwise as a single, coherent block.

Did Siletzia pivot about its northern end or southern end? This question has attracted considerable attention, with the evidence long suggesting a northern pivot. A key piece of evidence is that the Crescent Formation is laid over sediments (the Blue Mountain unit) derived from the continent, including boulders of quartz diorite some 65 million years old. This was previously interpreted as requiring the Crescent Formation to have formed close to the continent. However, new high-precision U-Pb dating shows that the overlying basalts are older, and therefore the Blue Mountain unit was not overlaid by the basalts, but thrust under them at a later date. Such under-thrusting implies that the northern end of Siletzia was initially further away from the continent, and permits radial motion about a more southerly or more easterly pivot near the Washington-Oregon border, as recently suggested.

This model has Siletzia forming on the continental margin along what is now the Olympic–Wallowa Lineament (OWL; a zone of topographical features of unknown age and tectonic significance), with the southern end of Siletzia and the Klamath Mountains (joined to Siletzia) near the Idaho Batholith in central Idaho. Further evidence for this comes from the sand of the Tyee Formation that overlie the Roseburg Formation. Not only does this sand have the same isotopic composition of rock in the Idaho Batholith (and of sand now coursing down the Snake and Columbia Rivers), but it appears to have not been transported very far from its source. This implies that the Tyee Formation was much closer to the Idaho Batholith when it was deposited, and subsequently rotated away. Geodetic surveys show that the region continues to rotate, likely as a result of extension of the Basin and Range Province and asthenospheric flow around the southern edge of the subducting Juan de Fuca plate.

North of the Columbia River, matters are more complicated. First, in southwestern Washington there is only half as much rotation as seen in rocks of similar age in Oregon. This is the basis for believing the Crescent terrane has broken from the Siletz terrane (perhaps because they formed on different oceanic plates), and undergone a different rotational history. Second, in Washington there is more variation in the amount of rotation and more faulting, which has led to a speculation that the Crescent terrane has broken up into eight or nine crustal blocks.

At Bremerton, on the east side of the Olympics, the measured rotations are less, and within the statistical error bounds of being zero; while further north, near Port Townsend, the rotation is slightly counter-clockwise. On Vancouver Island the paleorotations are counter-clockwise, and other evidence shows that the tip of the island has been bent, presumably as a result of the collision of Siletzia. The northwestern tip of the Olympic Peninsula also shows counter-clockwise rotation, of around 45 degrees. This raises a question of how much of the arcuate shape of the Crescent Formation is due to loss of material from the center after uplift by the Olympic Mountains, and how much reflects oroclinal bending.

Origin 
Siletzia's origin is not yet determined, and (as of 2017) remains controversial. Theories are still being developed, and even the details the theories depend on "have remained enigmatic". Following are several of the most notable models.

Models of how Siletzia formed are of two general types: (1) Formation well offshore (possibly as seamounts, like the Hawaiian-Emperor seamount chain, or a hotspot at a spreading ridge, like Iceland) and then accretion to the continent; (2) formation inshore, on or near the continental margin (perhaps as a result of transcurrent extension, or of a slab window). All current models then have Siletzia rifting away from the continental edge about a northern pivot.

Studies of Siletzia's origins have generally focused on accounting for two principal observations: the large paleorotation (described above), and the voluminous output (over 50,000 cubic miles, exceeding the volume of most continental rift zones, and some flood basalt provinces). Accounting for the observed volumes of basalt requires an enhanced magmatic source, for which most models invoke either the presence of the Yellowstone hotspot, or slab windows. The latter would have resulted from the subduction of the Kula-Farallon (or possibly Farallon—Resurrection) spreading ridge. The relation with the Kula-Farallon spreading ridge is an important element in all models, though its location through that epoch is not well determined.

Simpson & Cox 1977: Two models 
Seeking to explain the observed clockwise paleorotation, and noting that Siletzia appeared to have rotated as a rigid block,  proposed two models. First was rotation about a southern pivot in contact with the Klamath Mountains. This has various problems, especially because at the northern end sediments and even boulders from the continent are found at the base of the Crescent Formation, showing that it was near the continent from the beginning. In the second model (subsequently refined by ), Siletzia was originally adjacent to the Olympic–Wallowa Lineament, then rifted from the continent and rotated about a northern pivot near the Olympic Peninsula. Because sediments also show the Klamaths in close contact from the start, this requires the Klamaths to have moved with Siletzia. Originally there were conflicts in the understanding of when the Klamaths moved, and with the age and amount of rotation of the Clarno Formation in central Oregon.

Offshore model: A captured island chain? 
It featured a set of radiometrically determined (K-Ar and 40Ar-39Ar) ages that were younger in the center (for the Grays River volcanics) and older at the ends. This dihedrally symmetric age progression strongly suggested the pattern seen at spreading ridges, where the older rock is carried away on both sides from where the new rock erupts. Duncan considered five models (but none involving rifting or ridge subduction), favoring one where a hotspot — presumably the Yellowstone hotspot — intersected the Farallon-Kula spreading ridge (such as at Iceland) to generate a chain of islands. These islands were then accreted to the continent as the underlying oceanic crust was subducted.

This study has been criticized on multiple grounds, particularly regarding the ages. Duncan himself noted that measurement of the northern ages may have been affected by loss of argon due to low-grade metamorphism, and that there might be bias in respect of stratigraphic position. The latter was demonstrated by a recent study that showed, on the basis of geochemistry, that the Grays River volcanics followed the Siletzia eruptions, and thus are not representative of the initial phase of Siletz magmatism. Recent dating also shows a more monotonic trend of south to north age progression ("younging").

The range of the original ages was also a problem, as the rate of Kula-Farallon spreading over that time would produce a chain of seamounts much longer than observed, and too far away from the continent to explain the continentally derived sediments. This objection is attenuated somewhat in that the newer ages show a smaller range of ages.

Inshore models 
Various models have Siletzia forming inshore, on or near the continental margin. While all current models have Siletzia rifting away from the continent after accretion or formation, a subclass of "rifted" models consider the rifting to have caused the Siletzia eruptions.

 proposed that the Siletzia basalts might have "leaked" through transform faults (perpendicular to a spreading ridge) during changes in direction of the tectonic plates. The size of these eruptions and their location in this region is attributed to proximity to the Yellowstone hotspot. This "leaky transform" theory seems to be largely rejected, likely because the plate motion model it was based on was shown to be faulty.

Wells, et al., alternately suggested that as a terrane at the margin of the continent was pushed over the Yellowstone hotspot, it was rifted away from the continent by the upwelling magma, which then formed the Siletzia basalts. One such effect is the formation of a slab window (or slab gap) which would allow increased upwelling of magma.

Slab windows 
That spreading ridges could be subducted was recognized early in the development of plate tectonic theory, but there was little consideration of the ensuing effects. In the 1980s came realization that the magma welling up from the asthenosphere through the subducted ridge would not reach seawater, and thus not be quenched to form rock and close the gap. Continued spreading would lead to a widening gap or "window" in the subducting plate through which there could be increased flow of magma.

 showed that most of the Eocene and subsequent magmatism from Alaska to Oregon "is explainable in terms of ridge subduction and slab window tectonics". That is, a slab window — and a single subducted ridge can give rise to multiple slab windows — can provide adequate magmatism without having to invoke a hotspot (mantle plume). (So much so that it has been suggested that the Yellowstone hotspot may have been initiated by a slab window.) Mantle plumes and slab windows both feature voluminous magmatism; the main difference is that slab windows would form only where the spreading ridge is subducted. This implies formation at the continental margin, and then rifting, in the manner of the second class of models.

Gulf of Alaska 
Any model of the origin of Siletzia must account for interactions with plate boundaries that were being subducted under North America through the Eocene. Early studies were plagued by indeterminate locations for these boundaries, particularly of the Kula-Farallon (K-F) spreading ridge: basalts at the head of the Gulf of Alaska (along the Alaska panhandle) have ages and compositions corresponding to the Siletz volcanics, suggesting that the K-F ridge was offshore of the Yukon at the same time it was offshore of Washington. This can be resolved by assuming that by about 56 Ma the eastern part of the Kula plate had broken away to form the Resurrection plate, with the new Kula-Resurrection (K-R) spreading ridge running up the Gulf of Alaska towards Kodiak Island, and the former K-F (now R-F) ridge reaching Washington. Subduction of this plate under western Canada was rapid, and it disappeared entirely with subduction of the K-R ridge about 50 Ma.

This scenario then permits rapid transport north of crustal blocks such as the Yakutat terrane. Now lying southeast of Cordova at the head of the Gulf of Alaska, paleomagnetic evidence indicates it was formed at a latitude corresponding to Oregon or northern California. Similarly, certain schists on Baranof Island are believed to have been contiguous with the Leech River Schists (Leech River Complex) on Vancouver Island around 50 Ma, and subsequently transported northward with other elements of the Chugach-Prince William terrane.

After accretion: 50-42 Ma 
Whether formed far offshore as seamounts, or close inshore by a slab window, the Siletzian basalts were laid down on a subducting oceanic plate: the Siletz terrane on the Farallon plate, and the Crescent terrane most likely on the adjoining Resurrection plate (previously broken away from the Kula plate, which had previously broken away from the Farallon plate). In both cases the Siletzia mass was drawn toward the subduction zone, which possibly ran diagonally across what is now Washington, approximately at the position of the Olympic–Wallowa Lineament. However, Siletzia was too big to be subducted, and it accreted to the continent. Accretion is sometimes called "docking," but is more akin to a collision: various peripheral structures are first folded or crushed, then the main structures are deformed when they come into contact, and various parts get pushed over other parts, all this playing out over several million years. To the extent that the accretion of Siletzia to North America can be given a definite date most studies give it as about 50 Ma. This date has added significance as it is also the start of a change in direction of the Pacific plate, as seen in the bend in the Hawaiian-Emperor seamount chain, and also a change in the Pacific Northwest from compressional to extensional tectonics. This may also be when the last of the Resurrection plate was subducted under British Columbia. Initiation of the north-striking right-lateral Straight Creek Fault at ~48 Ma likely resulted from strain accumulated during the accretion of Siletzia.

As Siletzia accreted it also jammed the existing subduction zone, halting subduction of the Farallon plate. This terminated the Laramide orogeny that had been uplifting the Rocky Mountains, and triggered the ignimbrite sweep, a wave of large-volume silicic magmatism that swept over much of western North America between 20 and 50 Ma. This undoubtedly affected the enigmatic and controversial Challis Arc (stretching from southeastern British Columbia to the Idaho Batholith, roughly parallel with the Olympic–Wallowa Lineament), but the details of this are unknown.

Subduction, having ceased at the existing zone, eventually reinitiated further to the west as the current Cascadia subduction zone. Volcanism from the new subduction zone (such as the Grays River Volcanics and Northcraft Volcanics) reached the surface about 42 Ma, thereby initiating the rise of the ancestral Cascade Range.

Several other significant events occurred around 42 Ma, including cessation of metamorphism of the Leech River Schists (resulting from the Metchosin/Crescent Formation being thrust under Vancouver Island) and the end of strike-slip motion on the Straight Creek Fault; these may reflect the last movement of Siletzia relative to North America. On a broader scale, there was a change in absolute direction of the Pacific plate (marked by the end of the bend in the Hawaiian-Emperor seamount chain), and a change in the convergence of the Kula plate with the North American plate.

As subduction waned so did the force that had clamped Siletzia against the continent, and the tectonic regime shifted from compressional to extensional. Deposition of sand from the then proximal Idaho Batholith into the Tyee Formation in southern Oregon may have continued as late as 46.5 Ma, but was interrupted when Siletzia rifted from the continent and began rotating away. What initiated rifting is unknown.  suggested that as the continent overrode the Yellowstone hotspot, the upwelling plume tore away a previously accreted terrane.  suggested a change in the rate at which the plates were converging, or the "kinematic effects" (such as a slab window) from the passage of the Kula-Farallon ridge (or Resurrection-Farallon ridge).

See also 
Geology of the Pacific Northwest
Laramide orogeny

Notes

Sources 

.
.
.
.
.
.
.
.
.
.
.
.
.
.
.
.
.
.
.
.
.
.
.
.
.
.
.
.
. Available on Google Books.
.
.
.
.
.
.
.
.
.
.
.
.
.
.
.
.
.
.
.
.
.
.
.
.
.
.
.
.
.
.
.
.
.
.
.
.
.
.
.
.
.
.
.
.
.
.
.
.
.
.
.
.
.
.
.
.
.
.
.
.
.
.

Terranes
Lava plateaus
Geology of Oregon
Geology of Washington (state)